Kanjvaran or Kanjuran, also rendered as Ganjavran and Ganjuran, and also known as Gheyb Qoli, may refer to:
 Kanjvaran-e Olya
 Kanjvaran-e Sofla
 Kanjvaran-e Vosta